Dean Creek may refer to:

Canada
A tributary of the Winnipeg River in Ontario, Canada

United States

A tributary of the South Fork Eel River, north-central California

A tributary of Mossy Creek, Crawford County, Georgia

Dean Creek (Spotted Bear River tributary), a stream in Montana, US

Dean Creek (Cayuga Lake tributary), a stream in New York, US

Dean Creek, in Dean Creek Elk Viewing Area, Reedsport, Oregon

See also
Deans Creek (disambiguation)